Jack Brain (20 June 1920 – 25 January 2014) was  a former Australian rules footballer who played with Hawthorn in the Victorian Football League (VFL).

Personal life
Brain served as a signalman in the Australian Army during the Second World War.

Notes

External links 

1920 births
2014 deaths
Australian rules footballers from Victoria (Australia)
Hawthorn Football Club players
Australian Army personnel of World War II
Australian Army soldiers